Ethoofaaneerey is a 1998 Maldivian film directed by Ali Musthafa. Produced by Hassan Ali under Dash Studio, the film stars Aishath Shiranee and Hussain Sobah in pivotal roles.

Premise
A woman dies while giving birth to a twins. In a helpless condition, their uncle (Chilhiya Moosa Manik) handover one of the twins to an infertile parent (Aminath Rasheedha and Ibrahim) living in Male'. 

Several years later, Ifasha (Aishath Shiranee), an unattractive nerd, abandoned by her mother (Mariyam Haleem), joins a class to complete her studies where she is harassed and bullied for looking ordinary. Nifasha lashes out at her classmate, Fayaz (Hussain Sobah) when he approaches her in public, with whom she later bonds once he apologizes for being rude to her. A romantic relationship grows between them which resulted in them getting married and living their happiest lives with their daughter, Shuha (Mariyam Sheleen), until Fayaz's unfortunate demise in a fire accident. In a state of shock, Sheleen loses her voice and becomes mute.

Shuha sees Fayaz's twin brother, Latheef (Hussain Sobah) in a park and brings him home treating him as her father. Latheef tries every possible way to compensate for the loss of Shuha, though Nifasha's affection for Fayaz remains irreplaceable. Latheef narrates his past to Nifasha; an unhappy marriage with Aishath (Aishath Jaleel) gets influenced by the latter's vile mother (Arifa Ibrahim) who spoils their only child, Fizee (Aishath Fizee), a classmate of Shuha.

Cast 
 Aishath Shiranee as Ifasha
 Hussain Sobah as Fayaz / Latheef
 Aishath Jaleel as Aishath
 Arifa Ibrahim as Aishath's mother
 Mariyam Sheleen as Aishath Shuha
 Aishath Fizee as Aishath Fizee
 Aminath Rasheedha as Haseena; Fayaz's adoptive mother
 Ibrahim  as Fayaz's adoptive father
 Chilhiya Moosa Manik as Fayaz's uncle
 Mariyam Haleem as Nifasha's mother
 Shahzadh
 Ravee Farooq as Habeeb; Fayaz's friend
 Abidha
 Mohamed Nasheed
 Athifa Abdulla
 Mariyam Rizla as a school teacher
 Sithi Fulhu as Faathuma; house maid
 Ibrahimbe
 Azra
 Shiyam
 Mariyam Shazna (Special appearance in the song "Gaathuga Geydhoshun")

Soundtrack

Reception
Upon release, the film received mainly positive reviews from critics and audience. Reviewing from Mihaaru, Ahmed Adhushan included the film in the list of Shiranee's five best performances in her career and applauded the work by Ali Musthafa in his debut direction and acknowledges the chemistry between the lead actors.

References

Maldivian drama films
1998 drama films
1998 films
Dhivehi-language films